Tamlal Sahare is the Indian National Congress Member of Legislative Assembly for Katangi constituency in Madhya Pradesh, India.

References

Year of birth missing (living people)
Living people
21st-century Indian politicians
Balaghat
Indian National Congress politicians from Madhya Pradesh
Madhya Pradesh MLAs 2018–2023